Nottingham Rugby Club is a rugby union club based in Nottingham, England. The club's first team currently plays in the RFU Championship, the second tier of English Rugby.

The first XV are nicknamed The Archers, in reference to the famous Robin Hood. Now situated in the Lady Bay area of Nottingham, the club was formerly based at Meadow Lane, the home ground of Notts County F.C. They previously played at Ireland Avenue in Beeston until the end of the 2005–06 season.

History
The club was established circa 1877 by Alexander Birkin after returning from Rugby School, where he was introduced to the sport. The Birkin family later purchased the land at Ireland Avenue that would be the home of the club until 2006.

The club's heyday was in the late 1980s with a number of top international players representing the first XV. These included Simon Hodgkinson, Rob Andrew, Gary Rees, Dusty Hare and Brian Moore (also a Lion) representing England and Chris Gray representing Scotland.

The advent of professionalism saw the Green & Whites fall on hard times and the first XV narrowly avoided relegation to the regional divisions in 2002–03. The club has bounced back since then and was promoted into National League One in 2003–04. The club finished a creditable 7th in 2005–06 before leaving Ireland Avenue after 102 years. Alistair Bow was appointed chairman in 2010 after having been a director since 2008.

Martin Haag appointed Dan Montagu captain on 21 July 2015. He replaced Brent Wilson who retired at the end of 2014–15 season.  Since then Ian Costello has been appointed as Head Coach, with Neil Fowkes and Alex O'Dowd rounding out the coaching team.

The club play at Lady Bay, previously at Meadow Lane. On 30 July 2010 the club signed an agreement to become part of Notts County PLC. In early July 2012 it was announced that Martin Haag had become the new director of rugby at the club.

A change in funding by the RFU ahead of the 2020–21 season forced the club into become only a part-time professional club.

Honours
Midland Counties Senior Cup winners: 1905–06
Midland Counties Junior Cup winners: 1907–08
Noel Syson Cup (Notts, Lincs & Derby Sevens) winners: 1935, 1936, 1943, 1944, 1945, 1949, 1950, 1951, 1952, 1955, 1959, 1965, 1966, 1967, 1970, 1971, 1972, 1973, 1974, 1975, 1976, 1980, 1981, 1983
Middlesex Sevens winners: 1944–45
Midland Merit Table champions: 1984–85
Selkirk Sevens winners: 1990–91

Current standings

Current squad

The Nottingham squad for the 2022–23 season is:

Notable former players

British & Irish Lions
The following Nottingham players have been selected for the Lions tours while at the club:

 Brian Moore (1989)

Rugby World Cup
The following are players which have represented their countries at the Rugby World Cup while playing for Nottingham:

Other notable former players
The following players have played for Nottingham and have been capped by their national side.
  Rob Andrew, England and British & Irish Lions
  Vincent Cartwright, England captain
  Dusty Hare, England and British & Irish Lions
  Chris Wyles, United States
  Ali Williams, All Black #1022
  Chris Oti, England
  Tom Youngs, England and British & Irish Lions
  Alex Corbisiero, England and British & Irish Lions
  Nick Preston, England
  Neil Back, England and British & Irish Lions

References

External links
The Official Site of Nottingham RFC

Premiership Rugby teams
English rugby union teams
Rugby clubs established in 1877
Sport in Nottingham
Rugby union in Nottinghamshire
1877 establishments in England